William Stewart Harris (13 December 1922 – 6 December 1994) was a senior research fellow in anthropology in the Research School of Pacific Studies at the Australian National University. He was known as a  journalist and Aboriginal rights advocate who also published on a range of other subjects, including Palestinian self-determination and the defence of the Builders' Labourers' Federation who had come under attack for its militant industrial actions and its campaigns on environmental and social issues. He was an outspoken opponent of Apartheid and was arrested and charged with hindering police during demonstrations against the 1971 Springbok South African rugby union tour of Australia.

Early life 
William Stewart Harris was born on 13 December 1922 at Woking, Surrey, England. His parents were Henry Harris, retired banker, and his Victorian-born wife Katie (née Hay). He was educated at Marlborough College and then Clare College, Cambridge (BA, 1944; MA, 1948).

After service with the Royal Naval Volunteer Reserve during World War II he undertook study at the London School of Journalism.

Personal life 
On 8 October 1955 Harris married Burmese-born Mary Orr Deas, daughter of a Scottish company director, at St Paul's Church of England, Knightsbridge. The couple had four children: Nick, Karina, Alastair and Iona.

Later life 
Harris died of bacterial meningitis on 6 December 1994 in Woden Valley Hospital, Canberra.

References 

1922 births
1994 deaths
Academic staff of the Australian National University
Australian anthropologists
British emigrants to Australia
Alumni of Clare College, Cambridge
Alumni of the London School of Journalism